Benjamin Seaver (April 12, 1795 – February 14, 1856) was an American politician, serving as the thirteenth mayor of Boston, Massachusetts from January 5, 1852 to January 2, 1854.

Early life

Seaver was born in Roxbury, Massachusetts  In 1812 Seaver became an apprentice at the auction and commission store of Whitwell & Bond.  In 1816 Seaver became a partner in the firm which was renamed Whitwell, Bond & Co. In 1818, Seaver purchased 5 shares of the Suffolk Bank, a clearinghouse bank on State Street in Boston.

Seaver married Sarah Johnson.

Political career

City of Boston Common Council

Seaver was first elected to represent Boston's Ward 5 as a member of the Common Council in 1845. He was reelected to the Common Council from Ward 5 in 1846 and 1847.  In 1848 Seaver moved to Ward 4 and was subsequently elected as a councilor from the new ward in 1848 and 1849.

In July 1847 Seaver was elected as President of the Common Council and he held that position for the two and a half years that he remained on the City of Boston Common Council.

Massachusetts legislature
From 1846 to 1848 Seaver served as a member of the Massachusetts House of Representatives and in 1850 and 1851 he was elected to the Massachusetts Senate.

See also
 Timeline of Boston, 1840s-1850s

References 

Mayors of Boston
Members of the Massachusetts House of Representatives
Massachusetts Whigs
19th-century American politicians
Massachusetts city council members
Massachusetts state senators
1856 deaths
1795 births